Saurabh Pandey (born 11 May 1988) is an Indian Television and Bollywood actor. Famously known for his portrayal as Lord Krishna in Suryaputra Karn on Sony Entertainment Television. His debut TV show as lead was Siddharth Basu's first Fiction TV show Jiya Jale for 9X TV in (2007).  He later played the role of Shaurya in his second TV show titled Shaurya Aur Suhani for Star Plus channel. He also played the role of protagonist in shows like Tere Mere Sapne, Ganga Kii Dheej and Razia Sultan.

Early life and education 

Saurabh Pandey was born in New Delhi, India to Hindu Brahmin parents.  He started his education at St. Mark's Senior Secondary School, Janakpuri. Saurabh furthered his education in Mussoorie where he studied at Mussoorie Modern School for six months and then later went on to complete his education at SelaQui International School, Dehradun.

Career 
Saurabh got his first TV show with Siddharth Basu's Big Synergy, titled Jiya Jale.  The show aired on 9X channel. Jiya Jale was Big Synergy's first fiction TV show. Saurabh played the main lead role of Chandan Bhamani. He then acted in another show Angad, which was originally supposed to be aired on 9X TV but due to the winding up of ANGAD TV, the show was re-launched by Star Plus. as Shaurya Aur Suhani. The romantic action based fantasy drama was produced by Sunjoy Wadhwa's Sphere Origins. Saurabh played the title role of super hero Shaurya.

A show by Star Plus channel in September 2009, titled Tere Mere Sapne and produced by Sunjoy Wadhwa's Sphere Origins was Saurabh's next show. Saurabh played the role of the protagonist, Sarju, a simple boy from a small village living his life in a big metropolitan city like Mumbai. In the year 2011, Saurabh appeared in a TV show titled Ganga Kii Dheej.  This was a joint venture of Harry Baweja's Baweja Movies and Flying turtle Films.  The show aired on Sahara One, and Saurabh played the role of Shivom.

After four years of gap in his acting career. In August 2015 Saurabh got back to his acting career and was seen on &TV's historical TV show Razia Sultan playing the role of Jamal-Ud-Din-Yakut. Immediately after the ending of his show Razia Sultan in November 2015, he was offered the role of Lord Krishna in Suryaputra Karn on Sony TV by the same production house "Swastik Pictures", who produced the TV show Razia Sultan.

Personal life 

Saurabh is the eldest among 3 siblings and was in a relationship with Indo-Canadian model and actress Zara Barring. After a 10 years of long term relationship with Zara Barring, both got married on 28 November 2017 in Juhu ISKCON temple Mumbai His brother Gaurav Pandey is also an actor and made his debut in Hindi film Humpty Sharma Ki Dulhania as Shaunty.

Filmography

As actor – TV shows

Films

Music videos

See also
Cinema of India
Bollywood

References

External links 
 
 White Light Army Pictures, Saurabh's production company website

Indian male television actors
Living people
Male actors from New Delhi
Indian male film actors
People from New Delhi
1988 births